The Natural History Museum of Crete (NHMC) in Heraklion, Crete is a natural history museum that operates under the auspices of the University of Crete. Its aim is the study, protection and promotion of the diverse flora and fauna of the Eastern Mediterranean region. The museum is based in a restored industrial building that used to house an electricity power plant.

Awards
In late December 2012, NHMC was awarded by the Academy of Athens with the Benaki award for “its diverse educational, research, writing and publishing work, its exemplary organization and its promotion of scientific research and training”.

See also
Cretaquarium

Notes

External links
Official website

Natural history museums in Greece
Museums in Heraklion
University museums in Greece
Museums established in 1981